Greer Field at Turchin Stadium is a baseball stadium in New Orleans, Louisiana. It is the on-campus home the Tulane University Green Wave college baseball team.

History
The stadium was named for Robert Turchin, a World War II veteran and 1943 graduate of Tulane, and his wife, Lillian Turchin, who headed the drive in 1990 to build it.

The stadium was in the midst of significant renovations following the 2005 season, but Hurricane Katrina nearly destroyed the facility, forcing the project to start over. Tulane had hoped to move into the renovated Turchin for the 2006 season but played the entire 2006 season at Zephyr Field in nearby Metairie. It was scheduled to be completed in April 2007, but heavy rain during the winter of 2007 pushed back the opening to the 2008 season.

As the university spent $1.5 million before Katrina and was projected to spend $7.5 million after, the final renovation cost was estimated to be about $9 million, but by the end of construction the entirely new stadium had cost $10.5 million to build.

Shortly after construction commenced, the Tulane University Athletics Department "expanded the scope" of the Tulane Athletics Brick Campaign.  This mode of fundraising, in which fans could buy commemorative bricks to be placed at the entry of the new stadium, generated unexpected levels of interest, warranting the expansion.

In 2008, at the official reopening, "Greer Field" was added to the name in honor of Phil Greer, chair of the Board of Tulane. The newly renovated Greer Field at Turchin Stadium reopened for the 2008 baseball season on February 22 with a 6–0 win over Illinois-Chicago in front of a sellout crowd of 5,093 fans. Turchin hosted the Conference USA baseball tournament that season.

From 2011 to 2014, Turchin has hosted the Louisiana High School Athletic Association Class 5A (top classification) state tournament.

Tulane has won over 75% of its games in Turchin since its opening. In 2013, the Green Wave ranked 31st among Division I baseball programs attendance, averaging 2,080 per home game.

Attendance records

Single game

Year-by-year

Tournaments hosted
C-USA Tournament (3): 1997, 2003, 2008
Metro Tournament (1): 1992
NCAA Regional Tournament (2): 2001, 2005
NCAA Super Regional (1): 2005

See also
 List of NCAA Division I baseball venues

References

External links

 Turchin Stadium
 Seating Chart

Tulane Green Wave baseball venues
College baseball venues in the United States
1991 establishments in Louisiana
Sports venues completed in 1991